The National Convention Party was a former party formed by Aziz Ishak, former Minister for Agriculture and Co-operatives, with backing from farmers and fisherman.

History
The party was formed by Aziz Ishak on 29 August 1963. It main objective were to organize so-called "Malay-left", composed of the poorest peasants, the most insecure fisherman, and other discontented rural dwellers as part of a centre coalition to oppose the Alliance. It were formed after he resigned from the Cabinet and expelled from UMNO and Alliance. In 1964, the party joined the Malayan Peoples' Socialist Front.

In 1963, shortly after the events of the Indonesia-Malaysia confrontation, the government has taken action against several opposition politicians and activists. SF was seen as pro-Indonesia and pro-China, causing the Socialist Front leader was arrested. Among those detained and arrested was Ahmad Boestamam (PR president), Ishak Haji Muhammad (PBM president), Abdul Aziz Ishak (Gerakan Angkatan Melayu Sedar president) and Datuk Kampo Radjo (later to become president of the PRM), Tan Kai Hee, Tan Hock Hin, Dr. Rajakumar, Hasnul Hadi, Tajuddin Kahar and hundreds of others. Rallies and mass demonstrations were held on February 13, 1965 in Kuala Lumpur in conjunction with the second anniversary of the detention of Ahmad Boestamam and others to oppose the mass arrests of activists and leaders of the SF under the Internal Security Act and the alleged involvement activities "subversion".

General election results

References

Socialist parties in Malaysia
Political parties established in 1963
1963 establishments in Malaysia
Defunct political parties in Malaysia